Franklin is an unincorporated community and census-designated place in Greenlee County, Arizona, United States. As of the 2010 census it had a population of 92. Residents of Franklin are zoned to Duncan public schools, such ase the nearby community of York as well as Virden, New Mexico. Many residents work for the Morenci Mine, owned by Freeport-McMoRan in Morenci.

Demographics

References

Census-designated places in Greenlee County, Arizona